Gleditsia aquatica, commonly called water locust or swamp locust after its habitat of river swamps and slough margins, is a tree native to the Southeastern United States and adjacent regions.

Description
Gleditsia aquatica often grows 50 to 60 feet. It is commonly found in swamps and prefers partial sun.

Like the other plants in its family (Fabaceae) it produces a flat legume (pod). However, these pods usually only hold one seed.

The leaves are usually simple-compounded, but sometimes appears Acacia .[?]

Range and habitat
This water locust is found mainly in the southern regions of the United States. It is native to the Southeast, from Florida west to eastern Texas, north to Illinois. It can be found as far north as Ohio, southern New York and southwestern Connecticut. It is hardy to zones 6–9. 

Natural hybrids have been found to occur where G. aquatica overlaps with the range of Gleditsia triacanthos.

References

External links

Water Locust Gleditsia aquatica Diagnostic photographs and information. Morton Arboretum acc. 432-54-1

aquatica
Trees of the Eastern United States
Trees of the Southeastern United States
Flora of Texas